Okben Ulubay (born May 25, 1996) is a Turkish professional basketball player for Beşiktaş Emlakjet of the Basketbol Süper Ligi (BSL). He mainly plays the small forward position, but he also has the ability to play as a shooting guard.

Early career
Ulubay started playing basketball with the youth academies of the Turkish club, Efes Istanbul when he was five. He continued to play for the junior and youth teams of Efes while growing up.

Professional career
In 2012, Ulubay signed a seven-year contract with the senior men's club of Efes Istanbul. In 2013, he played in his first BSL game with Efes. He also played with the Turkish 2nd Division team Pertevniyal, which was at the time the farm team of Efes, via a dual license.

KK FMP
On July 4, 2019, Ulubay signed a two-year contract with Serbian team FMP. On 24 December 2020, FMP parted ways with him.

Petkim Spor
On January 5, 2021, he has signed with Petkim Spor of the Turkish Basketball Super League.

Galatasaray Nef
On August 11, 2021, he has signed with Galatasaray Nef of the Basketball Super League.

Beşiktaş
On July 23, 2022, he has signed with Beşiktaş Icrypex of the Basketbol Süper Ligi (BSL).

Career statistics

EuroLeague

|-
| style="text-align:left;"| 2014–15
| style="text-align:left;"| Anadolu Efes
| 2 || 2 || 17.2 || .556 || .333 || .500 || 2.5 || 1.0 || .5 || 1 || 6 || 6.5
|-
| style="text-align:left;"| 2016–17
| style="text-align:left;"| Darüşşafaka
| 2 || 0 || 1.4 || .000 || .000 || .000 || .0 || .0 || .0 || .0 || .0 || .0
|- class="sortbottom"
| style="text-align:left;"| Career
| style="text-align:left;"|
| 2 || 2 || 17.2 || .556 || .333 || .500 || 2.5 || 1.0 || .5 || 1 || 6 || 6.5

References

External links
 Okben Ulubay at euroleague.net
 Okben Ulubay at fiba.com (archive)
 Okben Ulubay at draftexpress.com
 Okben Ulubay at eurobasket.com
 Okben Ulubay at tblstat.net

1996 births
Living people
ABA League players
Anadolu Efes S.K. players
Beşiktaş men's basketball players
Darüşşafaka Basketbol players
Galatasaray S.K. (men's basketball) players
KK FMP players
Pertevniyal S.K. players
Petkim Spor players
Shooting guards
Small forwards
Basketball players from Istanbul
Turkish expatriate basketball people in Serbia
Turkish men's basketball players
Yeşilgiresun Belediye players